Homestead High School is a four-year public high school located in Mequon, Wisconsin, United States, a northern suburb of Milwaukee. Part of the Mequon-Thiensville School District, it serves a  area including the city of Mequon and the village of Thiensville. The school opened in 1959 and educates nearly 1,300 students annually. Its graduation rate is 99%, and its most recent average composite ACT scores were 23.4, the seventeenth-highest of any public school in the state. Homestead is accredited by the North Central Association of Colleges and Schools.

History
The area on which Homestead High School now stands originally belonged to the Potawatomi and Menominee Indians. In 1838, the land was taken by the United States government. Sales of the land occurred in 1835. In 1841 and Peter and Anna Frank received a land grant for the area, and in the following years, the 80-acre land area was owned by their children.

Homestead High School opened in 1959 with just Freshmen and Sophomores. Dr. Merton Campbell served as the first superintendent, and Lauren Dixon served as the first principal. Originally the school consisted of four wings, two music rooms, a small theater, cafeteria, and a gymnasium. Homestead has undergone four renovations/additions. In 1962, another wing was added. Three additional wings, the library, a swimming area, another gymnasium, a lecture hall, and an auditorium were added in 1968. In 1978, the school added an orchestra room. In 1998, the biggest renovation added a wing, a new heating and cooling system, fine arts rooms, another cafeteria with a food court, an academic support center, a field house for athletics, and a conference room for the district.

Enrollment
Homestead's enrollment decreased from 1610 in 2003, to 1405 in 2011-2012, and to 1282 in 2015-16.

Of the 1282 students, 0.3% are Native American, 1.8% are Latino, 3.6% are Asian, 3.3% are African American, and 91.0% are White.

Academics
Homestead High School teaches courses in business, computer science, cooperative education, engineering and technology, English, family and consumer education, fine arts, foreign language, mathematics, physical education, science, and social studies.

Honors courses include algebra 1, algebra 2/trigonometry, American literature, American studies-English, American studies-social studies, biology, British literature, business organization and management, calculus AB I, chemistry, English 9/argumentation, English 9, expository writing, French 4, geometry, German 4, independent study, Latin 4, multi-variable calculus, physics, pre-calculus, product development project, Spanish 4, and world studies.

Homestead offers A.P. classes in French, German, calculus AB, calculus BC, physics, Spanish, statistics, United States history, American government, biology, chemistry, macroeconomics, microeconomics, psychology, English language, and English literature.

The graduation rate for the school has been 99% or better for at least the past 10 consecutive years. Of the Class of 2011, 86% of the students were planning to attend a four-year college, 5% to attend two-year colleges, and 9% to work.

Recognition
In 2004 Homestead High School was recognized as a Blue Ribbon School, the highest honor a school can receive from the U.S. Department of Education. It was one of 33 public high schools in the United States to receive the honor that year. In 2009, BusinessWeek magazine ranked Homestead as the top high school in Wisconsin. The magazine noted that Homestead offered the "Best Overall Academic Performance". In 2011, Homestead was named one of the top 500 schools in the nation by Newsweek.

Athletics
Homestead won a state championship in boys cross country in 1967.

Homestead's football team has won six state titles (1999, 2006, 2008, 2012, 2015, 2018) 

Athletic Accomplishments at a Glance: 

 28 Varsity sport programs
 700+ Individual student athletes
 3.53 Cumulative GPA over the last 3 trimesters
 280+ Conference championships
 111 Individual state champions
 45 Team state champions

Fine Arts 
The Homestead Fine Arts Department comprises five areas: Band, Choir, Orchestra, Theater, and Visual Arts. Artists can select from courses in acting, directing, technical theatre, concert band, string orchestra, Highlander Choir, metals, ceramics, digital art, painting, photography, AP Music Theory, AP Research, and other stuff.

References

Public high schools in Wisconsin
Schools in Ozaukee County, Wisconsin
Educational institutions established in 1959
1959 establishments in Wisconsin